Ponta João d'Évora is a headland on the north coast of the island of São Vicente. It is located about 5 km northeast of Mindelo city centre and 3 km northwest of Salamansa.

See also
Geography of Cape Verde

References

External links
João d'Evora beach on mindelo.info 

Headlands of Cape Verde
Geography of São Vicente, Cape Verde